is a Japanese professional shogi player, ranked 9-dan. He is a three-time winner of the Ōi tournament, and also a former member of the Japan Shogi Association's board of directors.

Early life
Fukaura was born in Sasebo, Nagasaki on February 14, 1972. As a young boy, he defeated Kōji Tanigawa, who was the reigning Meijin title holder at the time, in a Rook handicap game at a shogi event in Fukuoka in 1983. Shortly thereafter, he went to stay with relatives in Ōmiya, Saitama in order to be closer to Tokyo and study under shogi professional . In 1984, Fukaura entered the Japan Shogi Association's apprentice school in 1984 at the rank of 6-kyū under the guidance of Hanamura. Although promotion to 5-kyū took a year, he progressed more rapidly up the ranks after that and obtained full-professional status in October 1991 at the age of 19.

Shogi professional

He would win the Quick Play Young Professionals Tournament three more times from 1999 to 2001, becoming the only player to win the tournament three years in a row.

In 2002, Fukaura defeated defending champion Kazushiza Horiguchi 3 games to 1 to win the  tournament. Fukaura advanced to the championship match by defeating Habu in the final game of the challenger tournament. The following year, however, Fukaura was unable to repeat his result, when lost the 22nd Asahi Open and his title to Habu three games to two.

Fukaura's first appearance in a major title match came in 1996 when he challenged Yoshiharu Habu for the 37th Ōi title, but was defeated 4 games to 1. His next major title appearance came more than 10 years later in 2007 when he once again challenged Habu for the Ōi title. Fukaura defeated reigning Ryūō title holder Akira Watanabe to win the right to challenge Habu for the 48th Ōi title, and then went on to beat Habu 4 games to 3 to capture his first major title. Fukaura successfully defended his Ōi title against Habu in 2008 (4 games to 3), and then again in 2009 against Kazuki Kimura (4 games to 3). Fukaura lost the first three games to Kimura before coming back to win the final four and defend his title, thus becoming only the second player to ever come back from such a deficit in a 7-game match. He was, however, unable to defend his title for the third consecutive time when he lost the 51st Ōi match to Akihito Hirose 4 games to 2 in 2010.

In January 2009, Fukaura became the 39th player to reach 600 wins in official games when he defeated Daisuke Nakagawa in the  tournament. His winning percentage of .681 was the fourth highest of all professionals who had previously achieved the same result. That same year, Fukaura and Habu met once again in the 58th Ōshō title match. Fukaura was actually leading the match 3 games to 2 before Habu won the final two games to defend his title. The two met again in the title matches of the 81st Kisei (in 2010) and 82nd Kisei  (in 2011) with Habu defending his title each time by the score of 3 games to 0. Game 2 of the 82nd Kisei had to actually be replayed with colors reversed because the first game ended in sennichite. The replay game lasted 206 moves before Habu won.

In November 2017, Fukaura became the 19th player to win 800 official games when he defeated Shintarō Saitō in a 67th Ōshō challenger league game.

Fukaura defeated Akira Inaba to win the 69th NHK Cup in March 2020.

Promotion history
Fukaura's  promotion history is as follows:
 6-kyū: 1984
 1-dan: 1987
 4-dan: October 1, 1991
 5-dan: August 27, 1994
 6-dan: July 22, 1997
 7-dan: June 28, 2001
 8-dan: April 1, 2004
 9-dan: September 26, 2008

Titles and other championships
Fukaura has appeared in major title matches a total of eight times, and has won the Ōi three times. In addition to major titles, Fukaura has won ten other shogi championships during his career.

Major titles

Other championships

Note: Tournaments marked with an asterisk (*) are no longer held.

Awards and honors
Fukaura has received a number of awards and honors throughout his career for his accomplishments both on an off the shogi board. These include awards given out annually by the JSA for performance in official games as well as other JSA awards for career accomplishments, and awards received from governmental organizations, etc. for contributions made to Japanese society.

Annual Shogi Awards
21st Annual Awards (April 1993March 1994): Best New Player, Fighting-spirit Award 
22nd Annual Awards (April 1994March 1995): Fighting-spirit Award 
23rd Annual Awards (April 1995March 1996): Most Games Played, Most Games Won
31st Annual Awards (April 2003March 2004): Technique Award, Best Winning Percentage 
35th Annual Awards (April 2007March 2008): Fighting-spirit Award, Game of the Year
38th Annual Awards (April 2010March 2011): Game of the Year
44th Annual Awards (April 2016March 2017): Game of the Year

Other awards
2007: Nagasaki Prefecture Citizen's Commendation/Special Award
2009: Shogi Honor Award (Awarded by the JSA in recognition of winning 600 official games as a professional)
2017: Shogi Fighting Spirit Honor Award (Awarded by the JSA in recognition of winning 800 official games as a professional)

Year-end prize money and game fee ranking
Fukaura has finished in the "Top 10" of the JSA's  fourteen times and in the "Top 3" once since 1993.

Note: All amounts are given in Japanese yen and include prize money and fees earned from official tournaments and games held from January 1 to December 31.

JSA director
Fukaura was selected to be a non-executive director for a two-year term at the 63rd JSA Annual General Meeting held in June 2012. He served in this capacity until June 2014.

References

External links
 ShogiHub: Professional Player Info · Fukaura, Koichi

1972 births
Japanese shogi players
Living people
Professional shogi players
Professional shogi players from Nagasaki Prefecture
People from Sasebo
Ōi (shogi)
Ginga